is a Japanese actress.

Shibata is represented with Stardust Promotion's Section Two. She is chosen as one of the Ribon Girls in 2009.

Filmography

TV series

Films

Stage

Advertisements

Music videos

Magazines

Notes

References

External links
 

Japanese child actresses
Stardust Promotion artists
1999 births
Living people
Actresses from Tokyo
21st-century Japanese actresses